The George Washington gold half eagle is a commemorative coin issued by the United States Mint in 1999, the 200th anniversary of Washington's death.

Legislation
The George Washington Commemorative Coin Act of 1996 authorized the production of a commemorative $5 gold coin (half eagle) to commemorate the life of George Washington, leader of the Continental Army during the American Revolutionary War and the nation's first commander-in-chief. The act allowed the coins to be struck in both proof and uncirculated finishes.

Design
The obverse of the George Washington gold half eagle, designed by Laura Gardin Fraser, bares a right-facing portrait of Washington. The reverse, also designed by
Fraser, features the Heraldic Eagle with outspread wings. Fraser's obverse was later used as the obverse for the coins of the circulating American Women quarters program.

Specifications
 Display Box: Maroon
 Edge: Reeded
 Weight: 8.359 grams; 0.27 troy ounce
 Diameter: 21.59 millimeters; 0.850 inch
 Composition: 90% Gold, 10% Alloy

See also

 List of United States commemorative coins and medals (1990s)
 United States commemorative coins
 George Washington 250th Anniversary half dollar

References

Modern United States commemorative coins
Cultural depictions of George Washington
Currencies introduced in 1999
Sculptures of presidents of the United States
1999 establishments in the United States
United States gold coins